Macroglossum soror is a moth of the family Sphingidae. It is known from Réunion (formerly known as Île Bourbon).

It is similar to Macroglossum milvus and Macroglossum alluaudi. There are four large, deep rust-coloured lateral patches on the abdomen that are not separated from one another. The forewing upperside has a discal spot which is rather large. The hindwing upperside is reddish orange, shaded with rust distally, without a yellow band, the base is not darker than the middle of the wing. The fringe is pale brown.

References

 Pinhey, E. (1962): Hawk Moths of Central and Southern Africa. Longmans Southern Africa, Cape Town.

Macroglossum
Moths described in 1903
Moths of Mauritius
Moths of Réunion